Phoenicus Portus or Limne Phoinikous may refer to:
Phoenicus (Cythera), a harbour town of ancient Cythera
Phoenicus (Messenia), a harbour town of ancient Messenia